The original plastic, metal and neon Coppertone girl sign was designed and made in 1958 by Tropicalites, a sign company owned by Morris "Moe" Bengis. Before producing the original Coppertone Girl sign, Bengis met with Benjamin Green, who invented the Coppertone product in his kitchen in 1944 and Abe Plough, the founder of Schering-Plough; which bought Coppertone in 1957. 

After Schering-Plough bought Coppertone, the original designs were lost in a fire.
In 1959 Joyce Ballantyne Brand recreated the now iconic Coppertone Girl artwork with very minor changes using her daughter Cheri as the model. As of late 2011, the sign has been in need of repair and funding. The owner, MiMo Association said they could not continue paying for insurance and maintenance. Merck, the parent company of Coppertone sunscreen makers Schering-Plough agreed to help and promised to pay US$1800 yearly for insurance and upkeep for the next five years.

References

External links
 Tomb, Jeffrey. 6 February 1995. ”COPPERTONE GIRL ON NEW TURF." Miami Herald
 Klinkenberg, Jeff. 5 September 2004. "Real Florida: Red-faced with the Coppertone Girl", St. Petersburg Times (2004-09-05). Interview with Joyce Ballantyne Brand
 Griffis, Margaret. Mar 2008. “Get That Girl in the Picture.” Biscayne Times
 Viglucci, Andres. 17 May 2008. ”DOWNTOWN MIAMI: Iconic Coppertone Girl sign may move to MiMo.” Miami Herald
 Griffis, Margaret. Uploaded 14 December 2008. . Flickr.com
 Bengis, Jerome. May 2008. “Get the story on the fate of Miami’s 1959 vintage Coppertone sign.” Bengis Fine Art & Appraisal.
 TV News Segments. 2008. Coppertone Sign Removal. YouTube.com.
 City of Miami Historic and Environmental Preservation Board. 7 October 2008. Agenda
 Viglucci, Andres. 8 October 2008. ”Two Miami icons designated historic landmarks.” Miami Herald
 Tropical Signs. 2008.  Bengis Fine Art & Appraisal
 Griffis, Margaret. July 2007. "New Life for the Coppertone Girl." Biscayne Times 
 Griffis, Margaret. December 2008. "Home At Last!." Biscayne Times 
 American Tropical Signs & Service. 2009. Removal, restoration and installation
 
Miami Modern architecture
Schering-Plough
Merck & Co.
Bayer
Beiersdorf brands
Individual signs in the United States
1958 establishments in Florida